Péladeau may refer to:

Persons
 Pierre Péladeau (1925-1997), editor and Quebec business man
 Pierre Karl Péladeau (born in 1961), Quebec businessman, son of the preceding
 Erik Péladeau, a business man of Quebec (printing), son of the preceding

Toponyms
 Péladeau River, a tributary of the Rivière aux Feuilles